Human-powered land vehicles are land vehicles propelled over ground by human power, The main ways to support the weight of a human-powered land vehicle and its contents above the ground are rolling contact; sliding contact; intermittent contact; no contact at all as with anything carried; or some combination of the above. The main methods of using human power to propel a land vehicle are some kind of drivetrain; pushing laterally against the ground with a wheel, skate, or ski that simultaneously moves forward; by pushing against the ground directly with an appendage opposite to the direction of travel; or by propeller. Human-powered land vehicles can be propelled by persons riding in the vehicle or by persons walking or running and not supported by the vehicle.

Many human-powered land vehicles can also be gravity-powered land vehicles, and vice versa, although some of the latter are quite awkward to use as the former. For example: street luges, gravity racers, and snow boards.

Types of ground contact
There are four main ways to support the weight of a human-powered land vehicle and its contents: rolling contact as with wheels; sliding contact as with skates, skis, or runners; intermittent contact as with stilts; and no contact at all as with anything carried. Additionally, these four methods may be combined as in wheelbarrows.

Wheeled
The most common wheeled human-powered land vehicle is the bicycle in all its forms. Other notable examples include:

Balance bicycles and dandy horses
Handcars, and draisines
Hotchkiss Bicycle Railroad and shweeb
Inline skates, roller skates, and roller skis
Kick scooters, kickbikes, knee scooters, and square scooters
Rickshaws, prams, strollers, roller buggies and buggies/Shopping trolley (caddy)
Skateboards, longboards, Penny boards, snakeboards, caster boards, Freeline skates, Surfskate (or Carveboard)
Tricycles, quadracycles, and velomobiles
Trikkes
Unicycles
Wheelchairs and baby walkers
Heel Skates

Sliding
 Skis, snowboard, snowskate
 Sleds
 Ice skates and clap skates
 Mud horses

Intermittent
 Stilts
 Powerbocking
 Pogo stick

Types of propulsion
There are three main methods of using human power to propel a land vehicle: some kind of drivetrain that turns one or more drive wheels; pushing laterally against the ground, to the side relative to the forward motion of the vehicle, with a wheel, skate, or ski that simultaneously moves forward; by pushing against the ground directly with an appendage, such as a hand or a foot, opposite to the direction of travel, or by pushing against the air with a propeller.

Drivetrain

Lateral motion of one or more wheels, skis, or skates

Ice skating
Skate skiing
Inline skating and double push

Direct contact with the ground
Skateboarding
Kicksleding
Poling

See also
Human-powered aircraft
Human-powered watercraft
Human-powered transport

References

Human-powered vehicles
Land vehicles